Andrew Mansale (born 5 August 1988) is a Vanuatuan cricketer and the former captain of the Vanuatu national cricket team.

Career
He played in the 2010 ICC World Cricket League Division Eight and 2013 and 2015 ICC World Cricket League Division Six tournaments. He captained the Vanuatu national cricket team at all three events.

In March 2018, he was named as the captain of Vanuatu's squad for the 2018 ICC World Cricket League Division Four tournament in Malaysia. In August 2018, he was named as the captain of Vanuatu's squad for Group A of the 2018–19 ICC T20 World Cup East Asia-Pacific Qualifier tournament.

In March 2019, he was named in the Vanuatuan squad for the Regional Finals of the 2018–19 ICC T20 World Cup East Asia-Pacific Qualifier tournament. He made his Twenty20 International (T20I) debut for Vanuatu against Papua New Guinea on 22 March 2019.

In June 2019, he was selected to represent the Vanuatu cricket team in the men's tournament at the 2019 Pacific Games. In September 2019, he was named as the captain of Vanuatu's squad for the 2019 Malaysia Cricket World Cup Challenge League A tournament. He made his List A debut for Vanuatu, against Canada, in the Cricket World Cup Challenge League A tournament on 17 September 2019.

References

External links
 

1988 births
Living people
Vanuatuan cricketers
Vanuatu Twenty20 International cricketers
Place of birth missing (living people)